The Danish Embassy in Santiago is the Kingdom of Denmark's diplomatic mission to Chile. It is located at Jacques Cazotte 5531, Vitacura, Santiago, Chile. The Embassy is generally tasked to follow Danish interests in Chile. 

This is e.g. performed by:
 Keeping Danish authorities informed of developments in Chile in areas of particular importance for Denmark.
 Strengthening the Danish export efforts and promote investment activities between Denmark and Chile.
 Providing prompt and effective assistance to Danes in Chile.
 Raising awareness of Denmark, Danish attitudes and Danish culture in the broadest sense

The embassy is also working actively to strengthen the Danish export efforts in Peru and Ecuador, while the embassy in La Paz, Bolivia is, responsible for consular services in these two countries.

External links
Foreign Ministry of Denmark

Buildings and structures in Santiago
Denmark
Santiago
Chile–Denmark relations